Historia von D. Johann Fausten may refer to:

 Historia von D. Johann Fausten (chapbook), a chapbook of stories concerning the life of Johann Georg Faust
 Historia von D. Johann Fausten (opera), an opera by Alfred Schnittke, based on the book